B-Mobile Communications Snd. Bhd. (stylized b•mobile) was a joint venture company between Telekom Brunei Berhad (TelBru) and QAF Comserve. Granted a 3G license in February 2005, b.mobile was Brunei’s first 3G mobile service provider, utilizing the established UMTS technology. In June 2014, its assets and infrastructure were purchased by a new company, Progresif Cellular.

See also
List of mobile network operators of the Asia Pacific region

References

External links
Telekom Brunei Berhad official website
Progresif Cellular official website

Defunct mobile phone companies of Brunei
Joint ventures